(The Family at Borgan) is a 1939 Norwegian drama film. It was directed by Helge Lunde.

Cast
Victor Bernau as Halvor Berg, a farm manager
Harald Steen as Borgan, a wholesaler
Joachim Holst-Jensen as Cohn, a lawyer
Lillemor von Hanno as Marie Berg
Georg Løkkeberg as Knut Borgan
Wenche Klouman as Anne, Berg's daughter
Thomas Thomassen as Borgan, a wholesaler
Eva Steen as the wholesaler's wife
Astri Steiwer as Lillemor Borgan
Vivi Schøyen as Åse Borgan
Per Schrøder-Nilsen as Victor Faber
Alfred Solaas as Erik Nelson
Pehr Qværnstrøm as Ola Bråten
Turid Haaland as Gurine Plassen
Alf Sommer as Nils Moen
Berit Alten as a boy
Henny Skjønberg as an old woman
Einar Vaage as a carpenter

References

External links
 
 Familien på Borgan at the National Library of Norway

1939 drama films
1939 films
Norwegian drama films
Norwegian black-and-white films
1930s Norwegian-language films